Monetary policy is the process by which the monetary authority of a country, generally  central bank, controls the supply of money in the economy by its control over interest rates in order to maintain price stability and achieve high economic growth. In India, the central monetary authority is the Reserve Bank of India (RBI).

It is designed to maintain the price stability in the economy. Other objectives of the monetary policy of India, as stated by RBI, are:

 Price stability
 Price stability implies promoting economic development with considerable emphasis on price stability. The centre of focus is to facilitate the environment which is favourable to the architecture that enables the developmental projects to run swiftly while also maintaining reasonable price stability.

 Controlled expansion of bank credit
 One of the important functions of RBI is the controlled expansion of bank credit and money supply with special attention to seasonal requirement for credit without affecting the output.

 Promotion of fixed investment
 The aim here is to increase the productivity of investment by restraining non essential fixed investment.

 Restriction of inventories and stocks
 Overfilling of stocks and products becoming outdated due to excess of stock often results in sickness of the unit. To avoid this problem, the central monetary authority carries out this essential function of restricting the inventories. The main objective of this policy is to avoid over-stocking and idle money in the organisation.

 Promoting efficiency
 It tries to increase the efficiency in the financial system and tries to incorporate structural changes such as deregulating interest rates, easing operational constraints in the credit delivery system, introducing new money market instruments, etc.

 Reducing rigidity
 RBI tries to bring about flexibilities in operations which provide a considerable autonomy. It encourages more competitive environment and diversification. It maintains its control over financial system whenever and wherever necessary to maintain the discipline and prudence in operations of the financial system.

Monetary policy committee 

The Reserve Bank of India Act, 1934 (RBI Act) was amended by the Finance Act, 2016, to provide a statutory and institutionalised framework for a Monetary Policy Committee, for maintaining price stability, while keeping in mind the objective of growth. The Monetary Policy Committee is entrusted with the task of fixing the benchmark policy rate (repo rate) required to maintain inflation within the specified target level. As per the provisions of the RBI Act, three of the six Members of the Monetary Policy Committee will be from the RBI and the other three Members will be appointed by the Central Government.

The Government of India, in consultation with RBI, notified the 'Inflation Target' in the Gazette of India Extraordinary dated 5 August 2016 for the period beginning from the date of publication of the notification and ending on 31 March 2021 as 4%. At the same time, lower and upper tolerance levels were notified to be 2% and 6% respectively. Inflation rate in 2020 is 6.2% .

Monetary operations

Monetary operations involve monetary techniques which operate on monetary magnitudes such as money supply, interest rates and availability of credit aimed to maintain price stability, stable exchange rate, healthy balance of payment, financial stability, and economic growth. RBI, the apex institute of India which monitors and regulates the monetary policy of the country, stabilize the price by controlling inflation.

Instruments of monetary policy
These instruments are used to control the money flow in the economy:

 Open market operations
 An open market operation is an instrument of monetary policy which involves buying or selling of government securities like government bonds from or to the public and banks. This mechanism influences the reserve position of the banks, yield on government securities and cost of bank credit. The RBI sells government securities to increase the flow of credit and buys government securities to control credit flow. Open market operation makes bank rate policy effective and maintains stability in government securities market.

 Cash reserve ratio (CRR)
 Cash reserve ratio is a certain percentage of bank deposits which banks are required to keep with RBI in the form of reserves or balances. The higher the CRR with the RBI, the lower will be the liquidity in the system, and vice versa. RBI is empowered to vary CRR between 15 percent and 3 percent. As per the suggestion by the Narasimham Committee report, the CRR was reduced from 15% in 1990 to 5% in 2002. As of 21 May 2022, the CRR is 4.50 percent.

 Statutory liquidity ratio (SLR)
 Every financial institution has to maintain a certain quantity of liquid assets with themselves at any point of time of their total time and demand liabilities. These assets have to be kept in non cash form such as G-secs precious metals, approved securities like bonds. The ratio of the liquid assets to time and demand liabilities is termed as the Statutory liquidity ratio. There was a reduction of SLR from 38.5% to 25% because of the suggestion by Narsimham Committee. As on 9 October 2020, the SLR stands at 18%.

 Bank rate policy
 The bank rate, also known as the discount rate, is the rate of interest charged by the RBI for providing funds or loans to the banking system. This banking system involves commercial and co-operative banks, Industrial Development Bank of India, IFC, EXIM Bank, and other approved financial institutions. Funds are provided either through lending directly or discounting or buying money market instruments like commercial bills and treasury bills. Increase in bank rate increases the cost of borrowing by commercial banks which results in the reduction in credit volume to the banks and hence the supply of money declines. Increase in the bank rate is the symbol of tightening of RBI monetary policy. As of 9 October 2020, the bank rate is 4.25 percent.

 Credit ceiling
 In this operation, RBI issues prior information or direction that loans to the commercial banks will be given up to a certain limit. In this case, commercial bank will be tight in advancing loans to the public. They will allocate loans to limited sectors. A few examples of credit ceiling are agriculture sector advances and priority sector lending.

 Credit authorisation scheme
 Credit authorisation scheme was introduced in November 1965 when P C Bhattacharya was the chairman of RBI. Under this instrument of credit regulation, RBI, as per the guideline, authorise the banks to advance loans to desired sectors.

 Moral suasion
 Moral suasion is just as a request by the RBI to the commercial banks to take certain actions and measures in certain trends of the economy. RBI may request commercial banks not to give loans for unproductive purposes which do not add to economic growth but increase inflation.

 Repo rate and reverse repo rate
 Repo rate is the rate at which RBI lends to its clients generally against government securities. Reduction in repo rate helps the commercial banks to get money at a cheaper rate and increase in repo rate discourages the commercial banks to get money as the rate increases and becomes expensive. The reverse repo rate is the rate at which RBI borrows money from the commercial banks. The increase in the repo rate will increase the cost of borrowing and lending of the banks which will discourage the public to borrow money and will encourage them to deposit. As the rates are high the availability of credit and demand decreases resulting to decrease in inflation. This increase in repo rate and reverse repo rate is a symbol of tightening of the policy. As of May 2022, the repo rate is 4.40% and the reverse repo rate is 3.35%.

Key indicators 

The key indicators as of 8 February 2023 are

References

Further reading 
 CRR, SLR, Repo Rate Historical Charts

Banking in India
Finance in India
Economic history of India
Government finances in India
India
Policies of India
Reserve Bank of India